Hip hop music is a genre developed in the 1970s by African Americans in New York City.  It began to spread around the world in the 1980s, and became a major part of Beninese music after a 1992 concert by Senegalese-French rapper MC Solaar.  At that concert, the crew  performed a Fon language-cover of Solaar's "Bouge de là".   are known for using folk styles like the Mahi tchinkounme and Yoruba music gbon.

References

20th-century music genres
21st-century music genres
African culture in New York (state)
hip hop
African hip hop
Beninese-American history
Hip hop by country